John White (? – 22 August 1692, in St. Andrews), was acting Governor of Jamaica in 1692.

Previously president of the council, White was acting governor during the 1692 earthquake that destroyed Port Royal. The historian William James Gardner wrote of him:

John Bourden succeeded him for a brief time as Governor.

Notes

1692 deaths
Governors of Jamaica
Jamaican people of English descent
17th-century Jamaican people